Ignacio Chávez may refer to:

Ignacio Chávez (politician), president of Nicaragua in 1891
Ignacio Chávez Sánchez (1897–1979), Mexican physician, founding member of the Colegio Nacional